Warlencourt-Eaucourt is a commune in the Pas-de-Calais department in the Hauts-de-France region of France.

Geography

Population

Places of interest
 The church of St. Pierre, rebuilt, along with the rest of the village, after World War I.
 The Warlencourt British Cemetery, in which over 3,000 soldiers who died during World War I are buried.
 The war memorials:
 A pyramid with a Catholic cross on the Rue du Calvaire. Erected on August 30, 1925 to commemorate WWI dead (4 percent of the pre-war population), also commemorates WWII dead.
 Butte de Warlencourt memorial, commemorating the 1916 battle on the ancient burial mound

See also
 Communes of the Pas-de-Calais department

References

External links

 The CWGC cemetery

Warlencourteaucourt